Saint Kitts and Nevis competed at the 1999 Pan American Games in Winnipeg, Manitoba, Canada from July 23 to August 8, 1999. The team consisted of just one athlete, in track and field.

Competitors
The following is the list of number of competitors (per gender) participating at the games per sport/discipline.

Athletics (track and field)

Saint Kitts and Nevis entered one male athlete in the triple jump event. Lloyd Browne finished in seventh place.

Key
Note–Ranks given for track events are for the entire round

Men
Field event

See also
Saint Kitts and Nevis at the 2000 Summer Olympics

References

Nations at the 1999 Pan American Games
1999
1999 in Saint Kitts and Nevis